One ship and one shore establishment of the Royal Australian Navy (RAN) have been named HMAS Encounter:

, a second class protected cruiser transferred from the Royal Navy to the RAN in 1912, and decommissioned in 1929
, a naval depot opened in South Australia as HMAS Torrens in 1940, recommissioned as Encounter in 1965, closed in 1994, and recommissioned in 2022.

Royal Australian Navy ship names